Cheltenham is a township  north-east of Feilding in the Manawatu District and Manawatū-Whanganui region in New Zealand's central North Island.

The settlement is named after Cheltenham in England, the home of one of the pioneer settlers, W. Mills. The town was home to the Cheltenham Co-operative Dairy Company, established in 1893. In 1920 the company moved their factory to Makino in Feilding. 

The area falls within the Rangitikei electorate. Cheltenham Public School, which opened in 1886, closed in 2016 after 130 years of operating.

Education

References

Populated places in Manawatū-Whanganui
Manawatu District